The Berom (sometimes also spelt as Birom) is the largest autochthonous ethnic group in Plateau State, central Nigeria. Covering about four local government areas, which include Jos North, Jos South, Barkin Ladi (Gwol) and Riyom, Berom are also found in some southern Kaduna State local government areas like Fadan Karshe with Berom settlers tracing their origins to Za'ang (Zawan) a Berom district on the Jos Plateau. They emigrated during the British Colonial Government of Nigeria. A large number of this tribe, if not all are Christians(about 99% of the populace of the Berom people are estimated to be practicing Christianity). Statistics also have it that about 49% of the population of Plateau State is made up of Berom people.

The Berom speak the Berom language, which belongs to the Plateau branch of Benue–Congo, a subfamily of the large Niger–Congo language family. It is not related to the Hausa language (which belongs to the Afro-Asiatic family) or other Afro-Asiatic languages of Plateau State, which are Chadic languages.

Culture 
The Berom people have a rich cultural heritage. They celebrate the Nzem Berom festival annually in March or April. Other festivals include Nzem Tou Chun (worongchun) and Wusal Berom. Its one of the major aborigine groups in Nigeria (Plateau State) that believes in a Judeo-Christian God (Dagwi).

Festivals 
Some Berom festivals include:

Mandyɛng, in March/April - harvest festival
Tyǐ, in August - red ochre collection festival
Badù, in March/April - harvest festival
Nshok, in March/April - harvest festival
Worong cun, in April/May - planting festival, celebrated after good rains
Búná/Vwana, in August - fonio harvest festival
Mado, in October/November - hunting festival celebrated for prosperity. Che people also take part.
Behwol, in February/March - hunting festival celebrated for prosperity. Che, Boze, Anaguta, inand Izere peoples also take part.
Nzem Berom, in March/April - one-week Berom festival celebrating Berom cultural identity that was first celebrated in 1981
Wusal Berom, in November - Christian festival that was first celebrated in 1992

Festivals in Berom culture are primarily related to agriculture and hunting, which have been the main events revolving around Berom livelihood and cosmology. Agriculture-related festivals are typically cycled around different villages.

Nzem Berom 
The influx of Christianity and western Education paved way for many socio-cultural changes in Berom culture. The changes devalued the rich culture of the people bringing serious predicament of a severe social and cultural crisis. In order to avoid the danger of losing the socio-cultural practice of the ancestor, and the overall precolonial activities such as the Mandyeng, Nshok, Worom Chun, Vwana, ceremonies were brought into a single umbrella festival called Nzem Berom. Nzem Berom is held within the first week of April, to coincide with the period when Mandyeng, Nshok and Badu Festival was held. The Nzem is a period when different cultural displays are exhibited from different parts of Berom land, especially in music, dance, arts and culture.

Mandyeng 
Mandyeng is a major festival celebrated in Berom land to usher in the rainy season. The festivals normally take place in March/ April. In the past the Berom regard Mandyeng/Nshok (they are very similar) the most vital festivals which ensured a good farming and hunting period and harvest. Not all the Berom communities celebrate Mandyeng and Nshok. Those that perform 'Mandyeng' claim their roots from Riyom, they include; Vwang, Kuru, Zawan, Gyel, Rim, Bachit, Bangai, Lwa, Sop, Jol, Wereng Kwi, Gwo, Kakuruk, Kuzeng, Kurak, Kuchin, Rahos and Tahoss. 
Nshok: Nshok slightly varies from Mandiyeng due to the fact that it also associates hunting with the rainy season farming. It is also held once a year around the months of April and May, to usher in the new season just as the Mandyeng.

Names 
In the pre-colonial era the Berom regarded hunting as both an occupation and a sport. Although economically it was not as important as farming, hunting was regarded as a show of skill and bravery. So much so, that most Berom names are derived from game animals, most importantly duiker, due to their perceived beauty. Names such as Gyang, Pam, Dung, Davou, Chuwang, Badung etc. for boys are most common, while girls answer to Kaneng, Lyop, Chundung, Nvou, Kangyang. These are names for different species of duiker. Others, such as Bot (frog) Tok (fish), Tsok (toad) etc. are names for other animals that are non-domesticated, but not game. These names clearly typify how important game was in pre-colonial Berom society.

Nshok was not the only hunting festival in Berom land. Festivals such as Mado and Behwol existed but are not as important as Nshok.

Music 
Some of the musical instruments among the Berom include:
 Yom Nshi: a two-string banjo made with calabash and skin as resonators
 Yom: a straw string instrument
 Kwag or Gwashak: a scraper made from dry cactus played with a stick slid across the sawed body of the dry cactus to produce a scraping sound
 Kundung: a xylophone made of cattle horns and cobwebs (image).

Berom musical instruments listed in Blench (2021):

Idiophones
Xylophone (kundung or yom bi tok)
Vessel rattle
Ankle rattles, made from Borassus aethiopum leaves
Scraper, guiro (gwák or gwàshák) made from Euphorbia kamerunica (yěp)
Membranophones
Barrel-drum (biŋ)
Gourd-drum, bing shi
Conical drum (rwey biŋ or bing gwom) reserved for royalty
Hourglass drum (kalangu)
Chordophones
Raft-zither (yom kwo)
Arched harp (yom waya)
[[Trough-lute (yom shi)
Aerophones
Flutes
Ju, single-note whistle ensemble
Ju shelo, fingerhole notch-flute
Unknown flute
Horns and trumpets
Transverse horn, bwo nyama
End-blown horn
End-blown trumpet

Berom dance equipment listed in Blench (2021):

Shang, fibre buttock ornament
Gadus or gawat, fly-whisk
Bong, dance hat
dance skirts

Leadership 
The Berom have a paramount ruler called the Gbong Gwom Jos. The traditional stool was created in 1935 by the British colonial administration of Northern Nigeria. Northern Nigeria was composed of completely different linguistic and cultural features between the ethnicities on the Plateau and the other groups. This ignorance of ethnic differences had initially encouraged the formation of vassal Hausa heads to oversee the created Jos Native Authority, which proved tumultuous with the Berom due to conflicting views and interests.

Through a circular; No. 24p/1916[JOS PROF NAK 473/1916], dated 15 August 1917, the Resident at Bauchi Province was instructed to send potentials from various native authorities including district and village heads to be elevated as chieftains by the Governor General. In response to the circular, the Resident wrote back to the secretary Northern Province Kaduna via a memo No. 24/1916 [JOSPROF NAK 473/1916] dated 27 October 1917, recommended a paramount ruler to superintend the native areas.

In the pre-colonial period, the Berom were divided into autonomous political groups based on regions, but the colonial authority merged them under the Gbong Gwom in 1952 to help coordinate the activities of the natives.

Leaders 
The first chief Dachung Gyang assumed leadership from 1935 to 1941. Under Dachung Gyang, the traditional institution was designated as the Berom Tribal Council composing of local chiefs within the Jos Native Authority. Its authority then only included mainly the Berom and excluded the chiefs of Buji, Naraguta, Jos and Bukuru. However, the government, in a Gazette of 7 February 1918, modified the list to include the Buji, Naraguta, Jos and Bukuru.

The emergence of Da Rwang Pam (1947 to his death on 14 July 1969) saw the elevation of the head of the Tribal Council to the stool of the Gbong Gwom Jos.

Since 1969, the stool has been held by the following:
 Da. Dr. Fom Bot, 19 August 1969 to his death on 1 December 2002
 Da Victor Dung Pam, 17 April 2004 to 7 March 2009
 Da Jacob Gyang Buba, 1 April 2009 to the present

The immediate past governor of Plateau State (2007-2015), Jonah David Jang, is of Berom origin.

Notable people
 John Dungs†, soldier, industrialist, politician and former Military Administrator of Delta State
 Sambo Daju†, physicist, educationist and public servant. Former Commissioner of Education; Lands and Survey Benue Plateau State
 D. B. Zang†, tin magnate and industrialist
 Jonah Jang, soldier and statesman, former Governor of Plateau State
 Philip Davou Dung Catholic Bishop of Shendam Diocese, appointment 5 November 2016
 Michael Botmang, politician and former Governor of Plateau State
 Davou Zang, Senator of the Federal Republic of Nigeria in the 4th National Assembly
 John Wash Pam† Senator of the Federal Republic of Nigeria and former Deputy Senate President in the 2nd National Assembly
 James Vwi, politician and Member of the House of Representatives of Nigeria in the 3rd National Assembly
 Gyang Dalyop Datong†, Senator of the Federal Republic of Nigeria in the 6th and 7th National Assemblies
 Gyang Pwajok†, Senator of the Federal Republic of Nigeria in the 7th National Assemblies
 Gabriel Bwan Fom† Member of the House of Representatives of Nigeria in the 4th and 5th National Assemblies
 Lamba Gwom†, Federal Minister of Transport in President Ibrahim Babangida's cabinet
 Istifanus Gyang, Senator of the Federal Republic of Nigeria in the 9th National Assemblies
 Edward Pwajok, attorney and Member of the House of Representatives of Nigeria in the 8th National Assemblies
 Dachung Bagos, Member of the House of Representatives of Nigeria in the 9th National Assembly
 Kachollom Daju, Permanent Secretary Federal Ministry of Labour and Employment 
 Stephen Dalyop Pam, Honourable Justice of the Federal High Court of Nigeria 
 Sambo Choji, footballer
 Chris Giwa, football personality and owner of Giwa F.C.
 Jeremiah Gyang singer and record producer
 Kenneth Gyang, filmographer
 Kevin Chuwang, Big Brother Africa Season 4 winner

References

 Nyam, S. D. (ed.). 2004. The Berom Digest. Jos: Berom Historical Publications

External links 
 Roger Blench, Berom Images

 
Ethnic groups in Nigeria
Plateau State